Grubb Mansion is an historic home which is located in the High Street Historic District, in Pottstown, Montgomery County, Pennsylvania. 

It was added to the National Register of Historic Places in 2003.

History and architectural features
Built in 1906, Grubb Mansion is a three-story, asymmetrical, brownstone building, which was designed in the Queen Anne style. Located in Pottstown's High Street Historic District, it features a nine-foot-deep front porch with an open turret, art glass windows and an octagonal tower. 

The dwelling was converted to office use in 1954 and a union hall was added to the rear in 1956.

It was added to the National Register of Historic Places in 2003.

References

Houses on the National Register of Historic Places in Pennsylvania
Queen Anne architecture in Pennsylvania
Houses completed in 1906
Houses in Montgomery County, Pennsylvania
National Register of Historic Places in Montgomery County, Pennsylvania
Individually listed contributing properties to historic districts on the National Register in Pennsylvania
1906 establishments in Pennsylvania